New Arts, Commerce and Science College, Parner is an educational institution in Parner city of Ahmednagar district in state of Maharashtra, India. The college established in July 1977 by Ahmednagar Jilha Maratha Vidya Prasarak Samaj.

Departments
 Marathi
 Hindi
 English
 History
 Economics
 Political Science
 Commerce
 Geography
 Physics
 Chemistry
 Botany
 Zoology
 Mathematics
 Computer Science

Undergraduate Courses

Bachelor of Arts (B.A.)
 Marathi
 Hindi/Optional English
 English
 History
 Economics
 Political Science
 Geography

Bachelor of Science (B.Sc.)
 Physics
 Chemistry
 Botany
 Zoology
 Mathematics
 Computer Science

Bachelor of Commerce (B.Com.)
 Commerce

Post Graduate Courses

Master of Arts (M.A.)
 Hindi
 Marathi
 Geography

Master of Science (M.Sc.)
 Organic Chemistry
 Analytical Chemistry
 Computer Science
 Mathematics

See also
 Parner tehsil

External links
 Official Website

References

Universities and colleges in Maharashtra
Education in Ahmednagar district
Colleges affiliated to Savitribai Phule Pune University
Educational institutions established in 1977
1977 establishments in Maharashtra